The 2022 Open BLS de Limoges was a professional tennis tournament played on indoor hard courts. It was the 15th edition of the tournament and part of the 2022 WTA 125 tournaments series, offering a total of $115,000 in prize money. It took place at the Palais des Sports de Beaublanc in Limoges, France, from 11 to 17 December 2022.

Champions

Singles

  Anhelina Kalinina def.  Clara Tauson, 6–3, 5–7, 6–4.

Doubles

  Oksana Kalashnikova /  Marta Kostyuk def.  Alicia Barnett /  Olivia Nicholls 7–5, 6–1

Singles entrants

Seeds 

 1 Rankings as of 5 December 2022.

Other entrants 
The following players received wildcards into the singles main draw:
  Audrey Albié
  Ana Bogdan
  Alizé Cornet
  Sofia Kenin
  Aliaksandra Sasnovich
  Zhang Shuai

The following players received entry from the qualifying draw:
  Jana Fett
  Ekaterina Makarova
  Marine Partaud
  Ekaterina Reyngold

The following players received entry as lucky losers:
  Émeline Dartron
  Joanna Garland
  Jenny Lim

Withdrawals
Before the tournament
  Cristina Bucșa → replaced by  Anna-Lena Friedsam
  Vitalia Diatchenko → replaced by  Carole Monnet
  Léolia Jeanjean → replaced by  Clara Burel
  Tamara Korpatsch → replaced by  Joanne Züger
  Tatjana Maria → replaced by  Émeline Dartron
  Alycia Parks → replaced by  Jenny Lim
  Nuria Párrizas Díaz → replaced by  Lucrezia Stefanini
  Diane Parry → replaced by  Greet Minnen
  Alison Van Uytvanck → replaced by  Katrina Scott
  Markéta Vondroušová → replaced by  Joanna Garland
  Dayana Yastremska → replaced by  Jessika Ponchet
  Maryna Zanevska → replaced by  Clara Tauson

Doubles entrants

Seeds 

 1 Rankings as of 5 December 2022.

Other entrants 
The following pair received a wildcard into the doubles main draw:
  Elixane Lechemia /  Marine Partaud

References

External links 
 Official website 

2022 WTA 125 tournaments
2022 in French tennis
Open de Limoges
December 2022 sports events in France